Ingrid Segerstedt Wiberg (18 June 1911 – 21 May 2010) was a Swedish journalist and politician. She was a prominent activist for freedom of speech, peace, human rights and the care of refugees.

Biography
Segerstedt Wiberg was born in Lund, Sweden as the second child of Norgwegian born   Augusta Wilhelmina Synnestvedt (1874-1934)  and Swedish journalist Torgny Segerstedt (1876–1945). Her brother Torgny T. Segerstedt (1908–1999) served as was Vice-Chancellor of the Uppsala University between 1955 and 1978. 

When Segerstedt Wiberg was one year old, the family moved to Stockholm and later on to Gothenburg in 1917, when her father became editor in chief for the newspaper Göteborgs Handels- och Sjöfartstidning.

Between 1958 and 1970 Segerstedt Wiberg was a member of the Riksdagen representing the Liberal People's Party.

She served as chairman of the Swedish section of the Women's International League for Peace and Freedom from 1975 to 1981.

References

Further reading 
 

1911 births
2010 deaths
People from Lund
Members of the Riksdag from the Liberals (Sweden)
Swedish journalists
Members of the Första kammaren
Members of the Andra kammaren
Swedish human rights activists
Pacifist feminists
Swedish democracy activists
Swedish women's rights activists
Swedish anti-war activists
Free speech activists